The Last Reel is a 2014 Cambodian drama film co-produced and directed by Kulikar Sotho. The film was selected as the Cambodian entry for the Best Foreign Language Film at the 88th Academy Awards but it was not nominated.

Cast
Rous Mony as Veasna
Ma Rynet as Sophoun
Dy Saveth as Srey Mom
Hun Sophy as Colonel Bora
Sok Sothun as Vichea

See also
List of submissions to the 88th Academy Awards for Best Foreign Language Film
List of Cambodian submissions for the Academy Award for Best Foreign Language Film

References

External links

2014 films
2014 drama films
Cambodian drama films
Khmer-language films